Mutage   is a wine making technique for making sweet wines.

Typical mechanism 
The typical process involves the addition of alcohol to the must so that the fermentation process is  prematurely stopped. Most yeasts die when the alcohol content in their environment is raised to approximately 13–15%. By stopping the fermentation of sugars, a sweet taste of the wine is achieved. This technique is used to make port wine and other sweet wines with high alcohol content.

Types of mutage
Two types of mutage are sometimes distinguished. A distinction being made between adding alcohol to the must before fermentation and adding during fermentation.
 Mutage sur grain: Where the mutage takes place during maceration on the skins. This is described as mutage on the cap of the marc and produces vin de liqueur
 Mutage after the traditional maceration and pressing producing vin doux naturel.

Noted wines referred to as having been made by mutage 
Reds
 Banyuls
 Maury
 Rivesaltes
Whites
 Muscat de Beaumes de Venise
 Muscat de Rivesaltes
 Muscat de Frontignan

Other techniques
Other techniques for making sweet wines exist such as vendange tardive, the noble rot, various filtration techniques or early heating of the must, and adding sweet musts after fermentation.

See also
 Fortified wine
 Vin de liqueur
 Vin doux naturel

References

Wine terminology
Oenology